The sixth series of the Australian cooking game show MasterChef Australia  premiered on Monday, 5 May 2014 on Network Ten.

This series was won by Brent Owens in the final against Laura Cassai on 28 July 2014. Coincidentally, Cassai and third-placed Emelia Jackson attended the same high school, Siena College. Owens is the last male winner until Sashi Cheliah from tenth series.

Changes
In a reversal from the previous season, the audition and preliminary stages were again broadcast as part of the series, and the weekly theme format was dropped. Series 6 also introduced the "power apron", which granted its wearer a number of advantages and control across a series of challenges.
In elimination challenges and pressure tests, the contestant wore black aprons with their name in it. The same type of aprons were used by eliminated contestants in week 8 of the 5th season of Masterchef Australia. In the previous seasons, the contestant who faced an elimination test or a pressure test wore a black apron without their name on it. 
In addition, the Immunity Challenges were expanded to have a preliminary round between three contestants before the winner moved on to cook for immunity against a professional chef. Kylie Kwong regularly appeared as a mentor during the Immunity Challenge episodes in addition to a recurring role as a guest judge.

Contestants

Top 24
The full Top 24 were revealed on Tuesday, 6 May. At the first Top 24 challenge, it was revealed that Cecilia Vuong, who was recovering from brain surgery due to a skiing injury, had withdrawn from the competition based on medical advice. Georgia Hughes, who had been the last one eliminated in the Top 50 portion of the show, entered as her replacement.

Future appearances

 Brent Owens appeared on Series 7 as a guest judge for a Mystery Box Challenge.
 Cecelia Vuong returned for Series 8 to have a second chance to win but reached 17th place.
 Brent also appeared in series 10 to support the Top 50.
 Laura Cassai (now Sharrad), Emelia Jackson and Tracy Collins appeared on Series 12. Tracy was eliminated on 24 May 2020, finishing 13th. Emelia won the competition on 20 July 2020, with Laura placing runner-up for a second time.
 Emelia appeared on the 3rd Junior Series as a guest judge for a Mystery Box Challenge.
 Emelia appeared as a guest judge for the first mystery box challenge of series 13, while Laura appeared for a masterclass.
 Sarah Todd appeared on Series 14 for another chance to win the title. Sarah placed runner-up on 12 July, 2022.

Guest chefs
Julie Goodwin – Mystery Box Challenge 1
Adam Liaw – Mystery Box Challenge 1
Kate Bracks – Mystery Box Challenge 1
Andy Allen – Mystery Box Challenge 1
Emma Dean – Mystery Box Challenge 1
Shannon Bennett – Pressure Test 1
Alla Wolf-Tasker – Pressure Test 2
Ollie Gould – Immunity Challenge 1
Christy Tania – Pressure Test 3
Benjamin Cooper – Immunity Challenge 2
Darren Purchese – Team Challenge 3, MasterClass 2
Joe Grbac – Pressure Test 4
Scott Picket – Pressure Test 4
Matt Stone – Immunity Challenge 3
Nobu Matsuhisa – Pressure Test 5
Jock Zonfrillo – Immunity Challenge 4
Marco Pierre White – Week 6
Donovan Cooke – Immunity Challenge 5
Vikas Khanna – Pressure Test 7
Jason Jones – Immunity Challenge 6 
James Viles – Immunity Challenge 6
Nick Palumbo – Pressure Test 9
John Lawson – Immunity Challenge 7
Dave Verhuel – Elimination Challenge 9
Heston Blumenthal – Week 11
Peter Gilmore – Final

Elimination chart

Episodes and ratings
 Colour key:
  – Highest rating during the series
  – Lowest rating during the series

Notes

References

External links
Official website

2014 Australian television seasons
MasterChef Australia